In military terms, 70th Division or 70th Infantry Division may refer to:

70th Infantry Division (Wehrmacht)
70th Division (Imperial Japanese Army)
70th Infantry Division (Russian Empire)
70th Rifle Division (Soviet Union)
70th Guards Rifle Division (Soviet Union), later 70th Guards Motor Rifle Division
70th Division (Spain)
70th Infantry Division (United Kingdom) (Second World War)
70th Infantry Division (United States)